is a railway station on the high-speed Hokuriku Shinkansen line in the city of Annaka, Gunma, Japan, operated by East Japan Railway Company (JR East).

Lines
One evening Hakutaka service also stops at this station. It is not served by any other lines.

Station layout
The elevated station consists of two side platforms serving two tracks. The station has a Midori no Madoguchi staffed ticket office.

Platforms

History
The station opened on 1 October 1997.

Passenger statistics
In fiscal 2019, the station was used by an average of 284 passengers daily (boarding passengers only). The passenger figures for previous years are as shown below.

Surrounding area

 Annaka Asama Elementary School

See also
 List of railway stations in Japan

References

External links

 Annaka-Haruna Station 

Stations of East Japan Railway Company
Railway stations in Gunma Prefecture
Hokuriku Shinkansen
Railway stations in Japan opened in 1997
Annaka, Gunma